The Aberdeen IronBirds are a Minor League Baseball team based in the city of Aberdeen in Harford County, Maryland. They are the High-A affiliate of the Baltimore Orioles and compete in the South Atlantic League. They were previously members of the New York–Penn League from 1977 to 2020, and of the High-A East in 2021.

The team is currently owned by retired Oriole player Cal Ripken Jr. Ripken Jr. purchased the team, then known as the Utica Blue Sox, and moved them to his hometown of Aberdeen in time for the 2002 season. The IronBirds play their home games at Leidos Field at Ripken Stadium, which is visible from I-95. On August 16, 2006, the IronBirds played host to the New York–Penn League All-Star Game. They also hosted the New York-Penn League All-Star Game on August 18, 2015. Leidos Field at Ripken Stadium was also used for the Cal Ripken World Series in 2003 and 2004, forcing the team to go on extended road trips, 20 or more games, during the youth competition.  The Cal Ripken World Series moved across the street to Cal Sr.'s Yard in 2005.

The name "IronBirds" was chosen for two reasons: Cal Ripken's "Ironman" streak of 2,632 consecutive baseball games played and the team's affiliation with the Orioles (the Baltimore team is often referred to as "The Birds"). The former team logo featured a silver airplane marked with Ripken's number 8, which also refers to the nearby Aberdeen Proving Ground U.S. Army installation. The team mascots are gray birds named Ferrous and Ripcord.

The record of most RBIs in a single month was set by Robbie Widlansky in July 2008. On August 26, 2013, Conor Bierfeldt hit his 12th home run of the season, setting a new IronBirds single-season record.  He broke the previous record held by David Anderson set in the 2010 season. On September 2, 2013, The IronBirds clinched their first McNamara Division Title.

In conjunction with Major League Baseball's restructuring of Minor League Baseball in 2021, the IronBirds were organized into the 12-team High-A East.

The IronBirds' 2012 and 2013 seasons were the subject of a book written by the team's former clubhouse attendant, Greg Larson. Clubbie: A Minor League Baseball Memoir was released in 2021.

Playoffs
2013 season: Lost to Tri-City 2–0 in semifinals.

2022 Season: Won against Brooklyn Cyclones 2-1 in Division Series. Lost to Bowling Green Hot Rods 2-1 in Championship Series.

Notable franchise alumni

 Andy Ashby (1987) 2x MLB All-Star
 James Baldwin (1991) MLB All-Star
 Jesse Barfield (1977) MLB All-Star
Zack Britton (2007)
 Ken Brett (1985, MGR) MLB All-Star
 Mike Cameron (1992) MLB All-Star
 Ray Durham (1991) 2x MLB All-Star
 Jason Grimsley (1986)
David Hernandez (2005)
 Fred Kendall (1992, MGR)
Manny Machado (2010) 4x MLB All-Star
Trey Mancini (2013)
Nick Markakis (2003) MLB All-Star
 Chuck McElroy (1986)
 Tony Taylor (1986–1987, MGR)
 Larry Walker (1985) 5x MLB All-Star; 1997 NL Most Valuable Player

Roster

See also
 :Category:Aberdeen IronBirds players

Notes

External links
 

New York–Penn League teams
Professional baseball teams in Maryland
Baltimore Orioles minor league affiliates
Baseball teams established in 2002
Aberdeen, Maryland
2002 establishments in Maryland
High-A East teams
South Atlantic League teams